In mathematics, the poset topology associated to a poset (S, ≤)  is the Alexandrov topology (open sets are upper sets) on the poset of finite chains of (S, ≤), ordered by inclusion.

Let V be a set of vertices. An abstract simplicial complex Δ is a set of finite sets of vertices, known as faces , such that

Given a simplicial complex Δ as above, we define a (point set) topology on Δ by declaring a subset  be closed if and only if Γ is a simplicial complex, i.e.

This is the Alexandrov topology on the poset of faces of Δ.

The order complex associated to a poset (S, ≤) has the set S as vertices, and the finite chains of (S, ≤) as faces. The poset topology associated to a poset (S, ≤) is then the Alexandrov topology on the order complex associated to (S, ≤).

See also
 Topological combinatorics

References
 Poset Topology: Tools and Applications Michelle L. Wachs, lecture notes IAS/Park City Graduate Summer School in Geometric Combinatorics (July 2004)

General topology
Order theory